SoftBank may refer to:

SoftBank Group, a Japanese multinational conglomerate holding company headquartered in Minato, Tokyo. SoftBank owns stakes in many technology, energy, and financial companies. It also runs Vision Fund
SoftBank Vision Fund, the world's largest technology-focused venture capital fund, with over $100 billion in capital
SoftBank Capital, a venture capital group in the United States, focusing on technology and telecom early stage businesses. It was founded by SoftBank
SoftBank Creative, or SB Creative Corp., a Japanese publishing company and a subsidiary of the SoftBank telecommunications company
SoftBank Telecom, previously as Japan Telecom Co. Ltd., was a Japanese telephone company of the SoftBank group. On 1 April 2015 Softbank Telecom Corp. merged into Softbank Mobile Corp. and ceased to exist as a separate entity.

See also
SoftBank Tomatoh Abira Solar Park, a solar power generating station in Abira, Hokkaido, Japan
Fukuoka SoftBank Hawks, a Japanese baseball team based in Fukuoka, Fukuoka Prefecture